Wesley Sandy Chandler (born August 22, 1956) is an American former professional football player who was a wide receiver in the National Football League (NFL) for eleven seasons during the 1970s and 1980s.  He was selected to the Pro Bowl four times, and ranked twelfth in NFL history in receiving yards and thirteenth in receptions when he retired. Chandler is a member of the Chargers Hall of Fame. He played college football for the Florida Gators and was also inducted into the College Football Hall of Fame in 2015.

Playing as a receiver in a run-oriented wishbone offense at Florida, Chandler set a school record with 28 touchdowns. He was named both an All-American and an Academic All-American in 1977. He was picked third overall by the New Orleans Saints in the 1978 NFL Draft. Over an 11-year NFL career, Chandler played for the Saints, the San Diego Chargers and the San Francisco 49ers.  He holds the NFL record for most receiving yards per game in a season, set in 1982 with the Chargers.  After retiring as a player, he became a football coach, and served as the wide receivers coach for various teams at the professional and college level.

Early life 

Chandler was born in New Smyrna Beach, Florida.  He attended New Smyrna Beach High School, where he was a standout high school football player for coach Bud Asher's New Smyrna Beach Barracudas. In his junior year the team was undefeated, including a victory over the Rams of Interlachen High School which snapped their 21-game regular season win streak. Chandler scored twenty-two touchdowns as a senior in 1973 (scoring five in a single game), and rushing for 1,052 yards and catching 22 receptions as a wishbone halfback. Prominent with him in the backfield were the brothers Reggie and Keith Beverly. Chandler earned the nickname "Little Joe" due to his small size.  In 2007, thirty-three years after he graduated from high school, the Florida High School Athletic Association (FHSAA) recognized Chandler as one of the "100 Greatest Players of the First 100 Years" of Florida high school football.

College career 

Chandler accepted an athletic scholarship to attend the University of Florida in Gainesville, Florida, where he was a wide receiver under coach Doug Dickey on the Gators football team from 1974 to 1977.  While he was a Florida undergraduate, Chandler became a member of Alpha Phi Alpha Fraternity (Theta Sigma Chapter).  As a Gator, he caught ninety-two passes for 1,963 yards and a school record twenty-two touchdowns in a run-oriented offense, adding six more scores on rushes and kick returns to set the school record for total touchdowns with twenty-eight. He led the Gators in receiving yards for three straight seasons (1975, 1976 and 1977), and despite many seasons of pass-oriented offenses since his time in Gainesville, he still holds Florida's career records in average yards per catch (21.3) and touchdown to reception ratio (one touchdown per 4.18 catches).

Chandler was a first-team All-Southeastern Conference (SEC) selection and a first-team All-American in 1976 and 1977, a first-team Academic All-American in 1977, and the recipient of the Gators' Fergie Ferguson Award as a senior team captain in 1977.  He also finished tenth in the balloting for the Heisman Trophy in 1977.  He is widely considered to be one of the best all-around football players to ever play for the University of Florida, and has been named to several all-time Gators and all-SEC teams, and was inducted into the University of Florida Athletic Hall of Fame as a "Gator Great" in 1989.  In 2006, The Gainesville Sun recognized Chandler as No. 6 among the top 100 Florida Gators players of the first 100 years of the team, and in 2015, Chandler was inducted into the College Football Hall of Fame.

Professional career 

Chandler was selected to the Pro Bowl after his second season in the league after finishing with 1,069 yards and six touchdown receptions. He was traded to the San Diego Chargers in 1981 to replace star receiver John Jefferson, who was traded to the Green Bay Packers after a bitter contract hold-out. In the opening round of the playoffs that year in a game known as The Epic In Miami, he caught six passes for 106 yards and returned a punt 56 yards for a touchdown in the Chargers 41–38 victory.

The following season was Chandler's best, when he led the NFL with 1,032 receiving yards and nine receiving touchdowns in the strike-shortened  season; his average of 129 yards receiving per game that year is still an NFL record. He also caught nine passes for 124 yards in a playoff win over the Pittsburgh Steelers.  Chandler represented Chargers players in the players' union, and many NFL players in that role were cut or traded after the 1987 NFL strike. After he was elected to the union's executive committee, Chandler was traded to the San Francisco 49ers, with whom he finished his career in 1988. He played in four games before retiring in October after tendinitis in a knee and frustration over his performance. The 49ers went on to win the Super Bowl that season. "My heart wasn't in it. It had nothing to do with being a quitter.  It was more about real-life decisions," he said.

During his 11-year NFL career, Chandler caught 559 passes for 8,966 yards and 56 touchdowns, rushed for 84 yards, returned 48 kickoffs for 1,048 yards, and gained 428 yards on 77 punt returns.  Overall, he amassed 10,526 all-purpose yards.  At the time of his retirement, Chandler ranked twelfth in NFL history in receiving yards and thirteenth in receptions.  He also earned four Pro Bowl selections, including three with the San Diego Chargers.  In 2001, Chandler was inducted into the Chargers Hall of Fame.

Post-playing career 

Chandler eventually went to Dallas after seven years coaching in NFL Europe, including a stint as head coach of the Berlin Thunder in 1999.  Before that, he also coached at the University of Central Florida in Orlando, Florida and Father Lopez Catholic High School in Daytona Beach, Florida. In January 2012, he joined the California Golden Bears as their receivers coach.

Chandler has established a scholarship fund for minority students through the Wes Chandler Celebrity Golf Classic.

Chandler also has two nephews in athletics. Dallas Baker was a standout wide receiver for the Florida Gators and was drafted by the Pittsburgh Steelers in the 2007 NFL Draft. Chandler's other nephew and Dallas's younger brother, Perry Baker, is a professional rugby player with the United States national rugby sevens team.

In 2015, he was one of the founders of the proposed league, Major League Football, and served as its first president. He resigned in July 2017 when the league was reorganizing after failing to launch.

See also 

 1976 College Football All-America Team
 1977 College Football All-America Team
 List of Alpha Phi Alpha brothers
 List of Florida Gators football All-Americans
 List of Florida Gators in the NFL Draft
 List of National Football League season receiving yards leaders
 List of New Orleans Saints first-round draft picks
 List of New Orleans Saints players

References

Bibliography 

 Carlson, Norm, University of Florida Football Vault: The History of the Florida Gators, Whitman Publishing, LLC, Atlanta, Georgia (2007).  .
 Golenbock, Peter, Go Gators!  An Oral History of Florida's Pursuit of Gridiron Glory, Legends Publishing, LLC, St. Petersburg, Florida (2002).  .
 Hairston, Jack, Tales from the Gator Swamp: A Collection of the Greatest Gator Stories Ever Told, Sports Publishing, LLC, Champaign, Illinois (2002).  .
 McCarthy, Kevin M.,  Fightin' Gators: A History of University of Florida Football, Arcadia Publishing, Mount Pleasant, South Carolina (2000).  .
 Nash, Noel, ed., The Gainesville Sun Presents The Greatest Moments in Florida Gators Football, Sports Publishing, Inc., Champaign, Illinois (1998).  .

External links

 Image of Wes Chandler

 

1956 births
Living people
American football wide receivers
Berlin Thunder coaches
California Golden Bears football coaches
Florida Gators football players
Frankfurt Galaxy coaches
National Conference Pro Bowl players
New Orleans Saints players
New York Sentinels coaches
Orlando Thunder coaches
Rhein Fire coaches
San Diego Chargers players
San Francisco 49ers players
UCF Knights football coaches
American Conference Pro Bowl players
All-American college football players
People from New Smyrna Beach, Florida
Players of American football from Florida
African-American players of American football
College Football Hall of Fame inductees
21st-century African-American people
20th-century African-American sportspeople